Zimpel is a surname of German origin. Notable people with the surname include:

Charles Frederick Zimpel (1801–1879), German-born, US-based architect
Sylke Zimpel (born 1959), German composer, choral conductor and lecturer
William James Zimpel (1859–1923), Australian furniture manufacturer and merchant, and politician

References

Surnames of German origin